Arundavapuram is a large village located in Ammapettai block, Papanasam Taluk, Thanjavur District, India.

Demographics
Arundavapuram had a total of 651 houses, and a population of 2,603 according to the 2011 census of India. The literacy rate was 73.01% compared to 80.09% for Tamil Nadu.

Nearest places
Arundavapuram is located 22.2km away from district capital Thanjavur;5.2km away from revenue block capital Ammapettai;7km from Saliyamangalam;9.1km from Needamangalam

Nearest airport
Thanjavur Air Force Station is the nearest airport to Arundavapuram. It is 24.8 km from Arundavapuram, but the main airport is the Karaikal Airport 58.4 km distance away.

Nearest beaches
Nagapattinam beach is the nearest beach, 56.7|km away from Arundavapuram. The other beaches nearby are Velankanni beach –  and Karaikal beach – .

References

Villages in Thanjavur district